Naaman (also known as Naamans Corner) is an unincorporated community in New Castle County, Delaware, United States. It is  0.5 mile south of the Pennsylvania state line and 7.5 miles northeast of Wilmington.  Naaman is located at the intersection of Delaware Route 92 and Ridge Road, northeast of Claymont.

Etymology

The name is believed to be derived from that of a Minqua chief who befriended the Swedish settlers of the area.

See also
Naamans Creek
Claymont Stone School

References 

Unincorporated communities in New Castle County, Delaware
Unincorporated communities in Delaware